Songtradr is a music licensing platform.

Platform
Songtradr is an automated music licensing marketplace, which as of 2019 had 400,000 artists using the platform in about 190 countries. Songs represented on the platform are licensed by companies for their advertisements, films, and television content, and recordings are searchable through the Songtradr database. Artists upload their music to the platform without charge, and set their own licensing fees. As of 2019, Songtradr was the largest music licensing platform in the world.

Acquisitions
In 2019 Songtradr acquired the creative licensing agency Big Sync Music. 

In 2021 Songtradr acquired the 'livestream-safe' music streaming platform Pretzel.

In February 2023, it was announced Songtradr had acquired the London-headquartered B2B music company, 7digital.

References

2014 establishments in California
American music websites
Companies based in Santa Monica, California